Jān Muhammad Khān Bahādur, was a Faujdar of the Mughal Bengal's Sylhet Sarkar. He was the successor of the previous faujdar, Syed Ibrahim Khan. In 1667, Khan granted some land to Sylheti residents. He gave Hariram Bhattacharya, father of Ramkeshav Bhattacharya, some land in Dulali Pargana. Khan was succeeded by Faujdar Mahafata Khan.

See also
History of Sylhet
Farhad Khan

References

Rulers of Sylhet
17th-century Indian politicians
17th-century rulers in Asia
17th-century Indian Muslims